The Gibbett Hill Formation is an Ediacaran unit cropping out in Eastern Newfoundland, representing a delta-top setting, with many red sandstones and occasional dark-grey shales.

References

Ediacaran Newfoundland and Labrador